The 2020 season was Viking's 2nd consecutive year in Eliteserien, and their 70th season in the top flight of Norwegian football. The club participated in the Eliteserien and the UEFA Europa League. The Norwegian Cup was cancelled.

Squad

Out on loan

Transfers

Transfers in

Transfers out

Loans out

Notes

Friendlies
On 12 December 2019, Viking announced the friendly matches to be played in pre-season.

On 12 March 2020, all football in Norway was suspended due to the COVID-19 pandemic.

Pre-season

Competitions

Eliteserien

Table

Results summary

Results by round

Matches
The Eliteserien fixtures were announced on 19 December 2019. The season was originally scheduled to start on 4 April, but due to the coronavirus pandemic the football season was delayed. The new start date for the league was 16 June.

Norwegian Cup

The 2020 edition of the Norwegian Football Cup was cancelled.

UEFA Europa League

Qualifying rounds

Squad statistics

Appearances and goals

|-
|colspan="14"|Players away from Viking on loan:

|-
|colspan="14"|Players who left Viking during the season:

|}

Goal scorers

References

Viking FK seasons
Viking
Viking